Tortel Fjord is an inlet of the Pacific Ocean in Chile's Aysén Region. The village of Caleta Tortel is located at the head of fjord. The fjord may lie in a zone of tectonic extension. The shores of the fiord are known to freeze in exceptionally cold winters.

References

Fjords of Chile
Bodies of water of Aysén Region